Biagio Morrone (born 4 March 2000) is an Italian footballer who plays as a midfielder for  club Recanatese.

Club career
He joined Juventus youth teams in 2014 and began to play for their Under-19 squad in the 2017–18 season. He played for Juventus in the 2017–18 UEFA Youth League and 2018–19 UEFA Youth League. In 2018–19 season, he was part of their Serie C farm-club Juventus U23, but did not make any league appearances.

On 12 July 2019, he signed a 3-year contract with Serie B club Salernitana. He spent most of the first part of the 2019–20 season with Salernitana's senior squad, but again remained on the bench in all the league and cup games.

On 31 January 2020, Salernitana sold his rights to Serie A club Lazio. On the same day, Lazio loaned him to Serie C club Rieti.

He made his professional Serie C debut for Rieti on 2 February 2020 in a game against Potenza. He substituted Enrico Zampa in the 24th minute and was sent-off in the 83rd minute after receiving two cautions in short succession. He made his first start on 16 February 2020 against Paganese.

On 10 October 2020, he joined Foggia on loan.

On 5 August 2021, he went to Monopoli on loan.

On 1 September 2022, Morrone signed with Recanatese.

International career
He was first called up to represent his country in September 2017 for the Under-18 squad friendlies.

References

External links
 

2000 births
Living people
People from Castellammare di Stabia
Footballers from Campania
Italian footballers
Italy youth international footballers
Association football midfielders
Serie C players
Juventus Next Gen players
U.S. Salernitana 1919 players
S.S. Lazio players
F.C. Rieti players
Calcio Foggia 1920 players
S.S. Monopoli 1966 players
U.S.D. Recanatese 1923 players